Maklew (Makleu) is a language of the proposed Trans-Fly – Bulaka River family in West Papua. It is spoken in Welbuti village, Merauke Regency.

Nearby languages are South Awyu and Marind of Okaba Subdistrict.

Phonology 

{| 
|m || n || ŋ
|-
|p || t || k
|-
|b || d || g
|-
| || s || h
|-
| || l ||
|}

{| 
|i ||  || u
|-
|e || ə || o
|-
| || a || 
|}

References

Bulaka River languages
Languages of western New Guinea